Firepro Systems, incorporated in 1992 by N S Narendra as a proprietorship, is a company that provides integrated solutions for fire protection, security and building management systems. The company went global early and used to get 25% of its revenues from overseas. In 2008 when the real estate market suffered a setback, FirePro was affected. In 2011 the company ran into a financial crisis and was unable to pay some of its employees. On 11 May 2012, Panasonic announced plans to acquire a 76.2% stake in the Rs. 700 crore Firepro Systems.

References

External links 
 Official website

Information technology companies of Bangalore
Indian companies established in 1992
1992 establishments in Karnataka
Software companies established in 1992